Julot the Apache (German: Julot der Apache) is a 1921 German silent film directed by Joseph Delmont and Hertha von Walther and starring Luciano Albertini, Alfred Haase and Linda Albertini.

The film's sets were designed by the art director Willi Herrmann.

Cast
 Luciano Albertini as Julot  
 Alfred Haase as Vivomte de Troyes  
 Linda Albertini 
 Paul Moleska 
 Hermine Straßmann-Witt 
 Ellen Ulrich as Daisy  
 Wilhelm Diegelmann as Pinkus Vandergold 
 Margarete Kupfer as Kokalaura  
 Hertha von Walther as Zofe  
 Fräulein Kühn as Nela Pogri, der große Filmstar

References

Bibliography
 Noah William Isenberg. Weimar Cinema: An Essential Guide to Classic Films of the Era. Columbia University Press, 2009.

External links

1921 films
Films of the Weimar Republic
Films directed by Joseph Delmont
German silent feature films
German black-and-white films